Murcia is a city in south-eastern Spain, the capital and most populous city of the autonomous community of the Region of Murcia, and the seventh largest city in the country. It had a population of 460,349 inhabitants in 2021 (about one third of the total population of the Region). The total population of the metropolitan area is 672,773 in 2020, covering an urban area of 1,230.9 km2. It is located on the Segura River, in the southeast of the Iberian Peninsula. It has a climate with hot summers, mild winters, and relatively low precipitation.

Murcia was founded by the emir of Cordoba Abd ar-Rahman II in 825 with the name Mursiyah.  It is now mainly a services city and a university town. Highlights for visitors include the Cathedral of Murcia and a number of baroque buildings, renowned local cuisine, Holy Week procession, works of art by the famous Murcian sculptor Francisco Salzillo, and the Fiestas de Primavera (Spring Festival).

The city, as the capital of the comarca Huerta de Murcia is called "Europe's orchard" due to its long agricultural tradition and its fruit, vegetable, and flower production and exports.

History

The territory has been inhabited by humans since prehistory. People also lived in the current municipality during the Bronze and Iron Ages. During the late Chalcolithic and the Bronze Age, the occupancy of part of the current municipality was performed by the Argaric people. During the late Bronze Age and the Iron Age, the people who inhabited the current municipality were the Iberians. A remarkable site is a religious building, whose name is the De la Luz Iberian Sanctuary. There are traces of people presence during the Roman rule in the Iberian Peninsula era. A construction of the late Roman period in the Iberian Peninsula is a fortress, Castillo de los Garres, located in the south of the northern half of the municipality.

It is widely believed that Murcia's name is derived from the Latin word myrtea or murtea, meaning land of the myrtle (the plant is known to grow in the general area), although it may also be a derivation of the word Murtia, which would mean Murtius Village (Murtius was a common Roman name). Other research suggests that it may owe its name to the Latin Murtae (Mulberry), which covered the regional landscape for many centuries. The Latin name eventually changed into the Arabic Mursiya, and then, Murcia.

The city in its present location was founded with the name Madinat Mursiyah ( 'city of Murcia') in AD 825 by Abd ar-Rahman II, who was then the emir of Córdoba. Umayyad planners, taking advantage of the course of the river Segura, created a complex network of irrigation channels that made the town's agricultural existence prosperous. In the 12th century the traveller and writer Muhammad al-Idrisi described the city of Murcia as populous and strongly fortified. After the fall of the Caliphate of Córdoba in 1031, Murcia passed under the successive rules of the powers seated variously at Almería and Toledo, but finally became capital of its own kingdom with Ibn Tahir. After the fall of the Almoravide empire, Ibn Mardanis made Murcia the capital of a new independent kingdom. At this time, Murcia was a very prosperous city, famous for its ceramics, exported to Italian towns, as well as for silk and paper industries, the first in Europe. The coinage of Murcia was considered as model in all the continent. The mystic Ibn Arabi (1165–1240) and the poet Ibn al-Jinan (d.1214) were born in Murcia during this period.

In 1172 Murcia was conquered by the north African Almohades, the last Muslim empire to rule southern Spain, and as the forces of the Christian Reconquista gained the upper hand, was the capital of a small Muslim emirate from 1223 to 1243. By the treaty of Alcaraz, in 1243, the Christian king Ferdinand III of Castile made Murcia a protectorate, getting access to the Mediterranean sea while Murcia was protected against Granada and Aragon. The Christian population of the town became the majority as immigrants poured in from almost all parts of the Iberian Peninsula. Christian immigration was encouraged with the goal of establishing a loyal Christian base. These measures led to the Muslim popular revolt in 1264, which was quelled by James I of Aragon in 1266, conquering Murcia and bringing Aragonese and Catalan immigrants with him.

After this, during the reign of Alfonso X of Castile, Murcia was one of his capitals with Toledo and Seville.

The Murcian duality: Catalan population in a Castillian territory, brought the subsequent conquest of the city by James II of Aragon in 1296. In 1304, Murcia was finally incorporated into Castile under the Treaty of Torrellas.

Murcia's prosperity declined as the Mediterranean lost trade to the ocean routes and from the wars between the Christians and the Ottoman Empire. The old prosperity of Murcia became crises during 14th century because of its border location with the neighbouring Muslim kingdom of Granada, but flourished after its conquest in 1492 and again in the 18th century, benefiting greatly from a boom in the silk industry. Most of the modern city's landmark churches, monuments and old architecture date from this period. In this century, Murcia lived an important role in Bourbon victory in the War of the Spanish Succession, thanks to Cardinal Belluga. In 1810, Murcia was looted by Napoleonic troops; it then suffered a major earthquake in 1829. According to contemporaneous accounts, an estimated 6,000 people died from the disaster's effects across the province. Plague and cholera followed.

The town and surrounding area suffered badly from floods in 1651, 1879, 1946 and 1948, though the construction of a levee helped to stave off the repeated floods from the Segura. A popular pedestrian walkway, the Malecon, runs along the top of the levee.

Murcia has been the capital of the province of Murcia since 1833 and, with its creation by the central government in 1982, capital of the autonomous community (which includes only the city and the province). Since then, it has become the seventh most populated municipality in Spain, and a thriving services city.

The 5.1  Lorca earthquake shook the Region of Murcia with a maximum Mercalli intensity of VII ('Very strong') on 11 May 2011. Nine people were killed and over 400 were injured.

Geography
Murcia is located near the center of a low-lying fertile plain known as the huerta (orchard or vineyard) of Murcia. The Segura River and its right-hand tributary, the Guadalentín, run through the area.

The best known and most dominant aspect of the municipal area's landscape is the orchard. In addition to the orchard and urban zones, the great expanse of the municipal area is made up of different landscapes: badlands, groves of Carrasco pine trees in the precoastal mountain ranges and, towards the south, a semi-steppe region. A large natural park, the Parque Regional de Carrascoy y el Valle, lies just to the south of the city.

Segura River
The Segura River crosses an alluvial plain (Vega Media del Segura), part of a Mediterranean pluvial system. The river crosses the city from west to east. Its volumetric flow is mostly small but the river is known to produce occasional flooding, like the times when the capital was inundated, in 1946, 1948, 1973 and 1989.

Mountains and hills
The Segura river's Valley is surrounded by two mountain ranges, the hills of Guadalupe, Espinardo, Cabezo de Torres, Esparragal and Monteagudo in the north and the Cordillera Sur in the south. The municipality itself is divided into southern and northern zones by a series of mountain ranges, the aforementioned Cordillera Sur (Carrascoy, El Puerto, Villares, Columbares, Altaona, and Escalona). These two zones are known as Field of Murcia (in the south of Cordillera Sur) and Orchard of Murcia (the Segura Valley in the north of Cordillera Sur). Near the plain's center, the steep hill of Monteagudo protrudes dramatically.

Districts

The  territory of Murcia's municipality is made up of 54 pedanías (suburban districts) and 28 barrios (city neighbourhood districts). The barrios make up the  the main urban portion of the city.

Climate
Murcia has a hot semi-arid climate (Köppen climate classification: BSh). It has mild winters and very hot summers because of its inland location. It averages more than 320 days with sun per year. Occasionally, Murcia has heavy, torrential rain.

Temperatures almost always reach or exceed  on at least one or two days per year. In fact, Murcia holds close to the highest recorded in southern Europe since reliable meteorological records commenced in 1950.

Demographics

Murcia has 460,349 inhabitants (INE 2021) making it the seventh-largest Spanish municipality by population. When adding in the municipalities of Alcantarilla, Alguazas, Beniel, Molina de Segura, Santomera, and Las Torres de Cotillas, the metropolitan area has 672,773 inhabitants making it the twelfth most populous metropolitan area in Spain. Nevertheless, due to Murcia's large municipal territory, its population density (547 inhabitants/km2, 760 hab./sq.mi.) does not likewise rank among Spain's highest.

According to the official population data of the INE, 12.52% of the population of the municipality reported belonging to a foreign nationality – 3.22% from other countries of Europe, 5.01% Africans, 3.68% Americans and 0.61% Asians .

The majority of the population identify as Christian. There is also a big atheist community.

Murcia is one of the communities with the largest Romani population in Spain.

The table below shows the population trends of the municipality from the late 19th century to the 21st century by the beginning of their decades.

Main sights

The Cathedral of Murcia was built between 1394 and 1465 in the Castilian Gothic style.  Its tower was completed in 1792 and shows a blend of architectural styles. The first two stories were built in the Renaissance style (1521–1546), while the third is Baroque. The bell pavilion exhibits both Rococo and Neoclassical influences. The main façade (1736–1754) is considered a masterpiece of the Spanish Baroque style.

Other buildings in the square shared by the cathedral (Plaza Cardinal Belluga) are the colorful 'Bishop's Palace' (18th century) and a controversial extension to the town hall by Rafael Moneo (built in 1999).

The Glorieta, which lies on the banks of the Segura River, has traditionally been the center of the town. It is a landscaped city square that was constructed during the 18th century. The ayuntamiento (city hall) of Murcia is located in this square.

Pedestrian areas cover most of the old town of the city, which is centered around Platería and Trapería Streets. Trapería goes from the cathedral to the Plaza de Santo Domingo, formerly a bustling market square.  Located in Trapería is the Casino, a social club erected in 1847, with a sumptuous interior that includes a Moorish-style patio inspired by the royal chambers of the Alhambra near Granada. The name Platería refers to plata (silver), as this street was the historical focus for the commerce of rare metals by Murcia's Jewish community. The other street, Trapería, refers to trapos, or cloths, as this was once the focus for the Jewish community's garment trade.

Several bridges of different styles span the river Segura, from the Puente de los Peligros, an 18th century stone bridge with a Lady chapel on one of its sides; to modern bridges designed by Santiago Calatrava or Javier Manterola; through others such as the Puente Nuevo (new bridge), an iron bridge of the early 20th century.

Other places around Murcia include:
 Santa Clara monastery, a Gothic and Baroque monument where a museum with the Moorish palace's remains from the 13th century is locared, called Alcázar Seguir.
 The Malecón boulevard, a former retaining wall for the Río Segura's floods.
 Santuario de Nuestra Señora de la Fuensanta, Algezares (1694), 17th century sanctuary and adjacent El Valle regional park: The construction began in 1694 and its architectural style is baroque with Murcian regional features.
 Los Jerónimos monastery (18th century). It was built during the first half of the century and is located in Guadalupe district, in the northwest quadrant of Murcia.
 Romea theatre (19th century). It was opened up by the queen Isabella II of Spain in 1862. Its façade has three bodies or levels.
Circo theatre.
 Almudí Palace (17th century), art gallery in a historic building with coats of arms on its façade. On its interior there are Tuscan columns, and since 1985 it hosts the city archives and periodic art exhibitions.
 Monteagudo Castle (11th century): in the district with the same name, in the north of the municipality.
 Salzillo Museum, showcases the art of 18th-century baroque sculptor and Murcia native Francisco Salzillo.
Centro Párraga, contemporary arts centre located in one of the pavilions of the old Artillery Headquarters of Murcia. It houses multiple exhibitions, performances and concerts throughout the year.
 Archaeological Museum of Murcia (MAM). It covers the rich Prehistory and History of Murcia, from the Palaeolithic to the Christian and Visigoth Period.
 San Juan de Dios church-museum, Baroque and Rococo circular church with the remains of the Moorish palace mosque from the 12th century in the basement, called Alcázar Nasir.

In the metropolitan area are also the Azud de la Contraparada reservoir and the Noria de La Ñora water wheel.

Festivals

The Holy Week procession hosted by the city is among the most famous throughout Spain. This traditional festival portrays the events which lead up to and include the Crucifixion according to the New Testament. Life-sized, finely detailed sculptures by Francisco Salzillo (1707–1783) are removed from their museums and carried around the city in elegant processions amid flowers and, at night, candles, pausing at stations which are meant to re-enact the final moments before the crucifixion of Jesus.

Murcia's Three Cultures International Festival happens each May and was first organised with the intent of overcoming racism and xenophobia in the culture. The festival seeks to foster understanding and reconciliation between the three cultures that have cohabited the peninsula for centuries, if not millennia: Christians, Jews and Muslims. Each year, the festival celebrates these three cultures through music, exhibitions, symposiums and conferences.

Festivities in the districts 
Sundry festivities are held throughout the municipality and districts and patron saint festivities are included each part. Month where some  occur are June and September. An activity that is slightly frequent in these festivities is the Coronación de las reinas, which usually consists in awarding the symbolic status of queens to three female children and three female teenagers. Holy Week festivities are also held in some districts on their own. Pasacalles (similar to standard parades) are also performed and so the desfiles de carrozas, which are parades in which floats play an important role. Religious activity includes processions (festive religious marches) in which there are statues of the Patron Virgin on a platform that is carried on the shoulders.

Economy

Economically, Murcia predominantly acts as a centre for agriculture and tourism. 33.1% of the municipality is utilised with crops purposes. 35.3% of the agreements of 2019 were written for jobs in agriculture and fishing sectors and 9.84% workers had signed agreements for crop land labouring in the second half of 2016. 

7.79% agreements corresponded to the industry sector in 2019 and 5.91% workers had signed agreements for industry labouring in the second half of 2016. 53.12% agreements corresponded to jobs of the service sector in 2019 and 14.26% workers had signed agreements for waiter jobs in the second half of 2016. 

The economy of Murcia is supported by fairs and congresses, museums, theatres, cinema, music, aquariums, restaurants, hotels, shopping centres, campings, sports, foreign students, and tourism.

Government 
As generally in Spain, the governors are elected indirectly by voting for a political party in a day for municipal and autonomous community (the regions in Spain) elections every four years. The governors that are elected compose a government body named pleno, which has 30 members in Murcia. The alcalde (head governor in a municipality) chooses 10 members from the pleno in order to compose a governing cabinet named junta de gobierno, which has 10 members in Murcia. There are 7 partisans (including the alcalde) of Partido Popular party and 3 partisans of Ciudadanos in the junta de gobierno. The largest government body also includes 9 partisans of PSOE (Partido Socialista Obrero Español), 3 partisans of Vox and 2 partisans of Podemos and Equo.

Transportation

Roads 
A national highway named A-30, which connects Cartagena and Albacete, traverses the municipality from south to north, A national motorway named A-7 also occurs in Murcia, specifically in its northwest. There is also a highway named MU-30 and it connects Alcantarilla municipality and El Palmar district, so it occurs in the northwestern quarter of Murcia. 52 regional pavement lines also occur in the municipality. The RM-1 road, which is intended to connect Santomera and San Javier, takes place in the east and the RM-15 highway, which connects Alcantarilla and Cehegín, occupies part of the northwest.

By plane 
Region of Murcia International Airport (RMU) is located 20 km south from the city centre, in the suburban district of Corvera. The airport operates several international and domestic routes. It was opened on 15 January 2019. Alicante–Elche International Airport is located 60 km north-east from the city centre. This is 5th busiest airport in Spain with 15 million annual passengers.

By bus 
Bus service is provided by LatBus, which operates the interurban services. Urban bus  is offered by a new operator, an UTE (Joint Venture) formed by Ruiz, Marín & Fernanbús.

By tram 

The Murcia tram is managed by Tranvimur. ,  of line were available. Two lines connect the city center (Plaza Circular) with the University Campus and the Football Stadium. Line 1B or Line L connects the neighbourhood of Espinardo with the UCAM and Los Jerónimos.

By train 
Train connections are provided by Renfe. Murcia has a railway station called Murcia del Carmen, located in the neighbourhood of the same name on the Chinchilla–Cartagena railway. Several long-distance lines link the city with Madrid, through Albacete, as well as Valencia, and Catalonia up to Montpellier in France. Murcia is also the center of a local network. The line C-1 connects the city to Alicante, and the line C-2 connects Murcia to Alcantarilla, Lorca and Águilas. It also has a regional line connecting it to Cartagena and a medium-range linea to Valencia and Zaragoza.

Healthcare
The hospitals and other public primary healthcare centers belong to the Murcian Healthcare Service.  There are three public hospitals in Murcia:
  in El Palmar that includes obstetrics and paediatrics units.
 : it is located in the main city nexto to Segura river.
 Hospital Morales Meseguer: it is also placed in the main city.
Large part of the municipality belongs to the Health area I (Murcia/Oeste), which main place is the main town. Nevertheless, the districts that are located in the northeastern quarter are included in Health area VII (Murcia / Este) and the district Cabezo de Torres is included in Health area VI (Vega Media del Segura).

Education
Murcia has three universities:
 two public universities: the University of Murcia, founded in 1272 and the Universidad Politécnica de Cartagena.
 one private university: the Catholic University Saint Anthony, founded in 1996.

There are several high schools, elementary schools, and professional schools. Murcia has three types of schools for children: private schools such as El Limonar International School, Murcia (a British international school) and King's College, Madrid, The American School of Murcia (an American international school), semi-private schools (concertado), which are private schools that receive government funding and sometimes offer religious instruction, and public schools such as Colegio Publico (CP) San Pablo, IES Licenciado Francisco Cascales or the centenary CP Cierva Peñafiel, one of the oldest ones. The French international school, Lycée Français André Malraux de Murcie, is in nearby Molina de Segura.

The private schools and concertados can be religious (Catholic mostly but any religion is acceptable) or secular, but the public schools are strictly secular.  Concertado or semi-private or quasi-private schools fill a need by providing schools where the government isn't able to or predate the national school system. The private schools in Murcia are not only English language schools. They also include Nelva, a religious school, and San Jorge, a secular bilingual Spanish school.

Murcia also offers Adult Education for people who want to return to complete high school and possibly continue on to the university.

Notable people

 Francisco Flores Arroyuelo (1939–2020), author and university professor
Muhyī al-Dīn Ibn al-'Arabī (1165–1240), Islam Sufi master and author, probably the most notable Sufi author of history with Al-Ghazali
 Nicolás Almagro (1985–), tennis player
 Carlos Alcaraz (2003–), tennis player
 Abul Abbas al-Mursi (1219–1286) Islam Sufi master
 Portu (1992–), professional football player
 Alberto Botía (1989–), professional football player
 Blas Cantó (1991–), singer
 Charo (1941–), musician, actress and entertainer
 Juan de la Cierva (1895–1936), inventor of the autogyro, a forerunner of the helicopter
 Luis Fajardo (c. 1556–1617), admiral and nobleman, conqueror of La Mamora
 Diego de Saavedra Fajardo (1584–1648), writer and diplomat
 Jorge Ruiz Flores (1975–), singer of Maldita Nerea Spanish band
 Ramón Gaya (1910–2005), painter and writer 
 Xuso Jones (1989–), singer
 Ruth Lorenzo (1982–), singer
 Vicente Medina (1866–1937), poet and writer
 José Moñino, conde de Floridablanca (1728–1808), statesman, minister of King Charles III of Spain
 Francisco "Paco" Rabal (1926–2001), actor
 Francisco Salzillo (1707–1783), Baroque sculptor
 Ibn Sidah (c. 1007–1066), Arabic philologist and lexicographer
  Francisco Antonio Marín del Valle, Governor and Captain General of  New Mexico between 1754 and 1760.
 Alejandro Valverde (1980–), cyclist

Sports teams
Some of the sports teams of the municipality are listed below:
 Racing Murcia FC — a fifth-tier club
 Real Murcia – it was founded in 1908 and is in the Spanish Third Division football.
 CF Atlético Ciudad – Spanish Third Division (Group 2) football (dissolved in 2010)
 UCAM Murcia – Spanish Third Division football
 CAP Ciudad de Murcia – Spanish Fourth Division (Group 13) football 
 CB Murcia – the team is owned by the UCAM private university and it has been in the Spanish Liga ACB basketball league, which is the first division basketball league in the country.
 ElPozo Murcia Turística FS – a futsal team which was founded in 1992 and plays in the first division.
 Hispania Racing F1 Team – Formula One racing
 CAV Murcia 2005 – a volleyball team, and its name is an acronym for Club Atlético de Voleibol. It won the Supercopa de España tournament in the 2005–2006 season. The team was the winner in the Superliga Femenina de Voleibol in 2008. It won the Copa de la Reina Spanish tournament in 2011. It obtained 13 titles and ended in 2011 due to its debts.
 Origen (esports) – the most well-known League of Legends team in Spain and was founded in December 2014. It was a finalist team in the 2015 summer playoffs. The team has also been in the League of Legends Challenge Series and in the League of Legends Championship series. The team relocated from Murcia to in Denmark in 2018.

Twin towns – sister cities

Murcia is twinned with:

Genoa, Italy (2018)
Lecce, Italy (2002)
Grasse, France (1990)
Irapuato, Mexico (2012)
Murcia, Philippines (2002)
Łódź, Poland (1999)
Miami, United States (1994)

See also
Kingdom of Murcia
 Christ of Monteagudo

References

Notes

Bibliography

External links

 Official website 
 Postal Codes Murcia

 
825 establishments
9th-century establishments in Spain
Municipalities in the Region of Murcia
Populated places established in the 9th century